Hugo Page (born 24 July 2001) is a French cyclist, who currently rides for UCI WorldTeam .

Major results

2018
 1st Overall Tour des Portes du Pays d'Othe
1st Young rider classification
1st Stage 2 (TTT)
 1st Bernaudeau Junior
 9th Overall Tour du Pays de Vaud
1st Stage 3a
 10th Chrono des Nations Juniors
2019
 1st  Time trial, National Junior Road Championships
 1st Chrono des Nations Juniors
 2nd La Route des Géants
 7th Time trial, UEC European Junior Road Championships
 7th GP Général Patton
 10th Bernaudeau Junior
2021
 5th Overall L'Etoile d'Or
 8th Overall Tour d'Eure-et-Loir
 9th Paris–Troyes
2022
 3rd Binche–Chimay–Binche
 5th Classic Loire Atlantique
 5th Famenne Ardenne Classic
2023
 2nd Cadel Evans Great Ocean Road Race

References

External links

2001 births
Living people
French male cyclists
Sportspeople from Chartres
Cyclists from Centre-Val de Loire